Andalucia is a genus of jakobids.

Classification 
The morphology of Andalucia broadly resembles that of other jakobids. Molecular data has not always been conclusive, but recent phylogenomic analyses indicate that Andalucia is a sister group to the other jakobids, in other words more closely related to them than to the Heterolobosea or Euglenozoa (the other two groups in the Discoba). The α-tubulin gene of Andalucia more closely resembles that of opisthokonts and diplomonads than its closer relatives, the apparent result of horizontal gene transfer.

Species 
As of 2009, the genus contains two species:

 A. incarcerata was until 2006 known as Jakoba incarcerata. It lives in sulfide-rich sediments, especially marine intertidal ones. Currently it is the type species of the genus Stygiella Pánek, Táborský & Čepička 2015.
 A. godoyi is a soil heterotroph.

Analysis of DNA sequences from the environment suggest at least two additional species which have not been isolated or formally described.

References 

Excavata genera
Jakobids